Kfarshima, also spelled Kfarchima, is a town in the Baabda District of the Mount Lebanon Governorate, southeast of Beirut and is part of Greater Beirut.  
The town is populated by Lebanese Christians: mainly Melkite Greek Catholic and Maronites, with smaller communities of Greek Orthodox and Protestant Evangelical Christians. Kfarshima was subject to heavy bombing during the Lebanese civil war since it was a primary fault line.

Kfarshima is the birthplace of the composers musicians and singers, Philemon Wehbi, Halim el-Roumi and Melhem Barakat, and the singers Marie Sleiman, and Majida El Roumi. Also the Birthplace of the Philosopher Shibli Shumayyil (Chibli Chemayel). It was also the hometown for Lebanese singer Issam Rajji.

Schools
Eastwood College
Ecole Saint Maxime
Lycée Adonis
Ecole Notre Dame Des Soeurs Antonine
Kfarshima Official Middle School
Kfarshima Official High School
National Protestant College

Churches
There are seven churches in Kfarchima:
 The Greek Orthodox church St. Peter & Paul, in Al-Mahatta.
 Three Maronite Churches: St. Elias in Balouh, New Lady of the Rosary in Sahet-al-Ain and the Old Lady of the Rosary in Ain-al-Rouhban.
 The Evangelical Church in Haret-al-Majjadin.
 The St. Takla Church for the Catholics located in Sahet-al-Ain.
The St. Antoine Church (Also called 'Deir Al Karkafi') located in Haret-al-Deir.

Notable residents
 Ilyās Farhāt, poet
 Saleem Takla, co-founder of Al-Ahram
 Shibli Shumayyil
 Hanna K. Korany

External links
Kfar Chima

Greater Beirut
Populated places in Baabda District
Melkite Christian communities in Lebanon
Maronite Christian communities in Lebanon